Miriam Ginestier (born 1968) is a Canadian interdisciplinary performance curator living and working in Montreal, Quebec. She is best known for her work as general and artistic director of Studio 303, Montreal's dance and interdisciplinary-arts centre. Between 1993 and 1995, Miriam Ginestier co-founded the long running feminist experimental performance festival Edgy Women in collaboration with Karen Bernard and Paul Caskey.

Miriam has contributed greatly to the Montreal creative community by her artist-driven approach to curation and production. Along with public activities and performances, Ginestier's events have sought to create a community where people of various backgrounds can meet and share viewpoints, and have brought together various forms of feminism. Her work as a freelance cultural event organiser for the lesbian community earned her the Arc-en-Ciel Award in 2003 for her contribution to the community. She was also responsible for the legendary and greatly missed lesbian monthly dance parties, Meow Mix, where she DJed as well.

Miriam has also performed on stage and in film, notably as flapper alter-ego, Fannie Nipplebottom.

Works

Curation 

 1994 - 2016:  Edgy Women Festival
 1996 - 2006: Le Boudoir Cabaret
 1997 - 2012: Meow Mix Cabaret
2012 - ongoing: Cabaret Tollé
2016 - ongoing: Queer Performance Camp

References

1968 births
Living people
Artists from Montreal
Women performance artists
20th-century Canadian artists
20th-century Canadian women artists
21st-century Canadian artists
21st-century Canadian women artists